Kayne is a given name. Notable people with the name include:

Given name
Kayne Gillaspie (born 1979), American fashion designer, specializing in beauty pageant gowns
Kayne Lawton (born 1989), Australian Rugby League player
Kayne McLaggon (born 1990), Welsh footballer who plays as striker
Kayne Pettifer (born 1982), Australian rules footballer in Australian Football League
Kayne Robinson, American president of National Rifle Association
Kayne Scott (born 1968), New Zealand racing driver
Kayne Taylor, Australian pop music singer from Melbourne who won 2004 series of Popstars Live
Kayne Vincent (born 1988), New Zealand football (soccer) player currently playing for Mumbai FC

Surname
Richard Kayne (investor) (born 1945), American billionaire private equity asset manager
Richard S. Kayne, American Professor of Linguistics and chair of Linguistics Department at New York University